Mary Ellinor Lucy Archer MBE (13 November 1893 – 3 May 1979) was the first woman scientist at the Australian CSIRO (Commonwealth Scientific and Industrial Research Organisation) and its Chief Librarian from 1923–1954, for which she was made a Member of the Order of the British Empire in 1956.

Early life
Archer was born on 13 November 1893 in Malvern, Victoria, Australia, to English civil engineer Oakeley Archer and Lucy Georgina Elizabeth, née Gaunt, and spent her childhood in Malaya. Her mother was Principal of the Trinity College Women's Hostel (later called Janet Clarke Hall) from 1906 to 1918.  Archer attended Melbourne Girls Grammar School and Melbourne University (B.Sc. 1916; M.Sc. 1918). She added Lucy Ellinor to her name becoming known professionally as Ellinor Archer. She became a government research scholar in botany and joined Trinity College's teaching staff.

Life and work
In November 1918, Archer was appointed to the Seed Improvement Committee of the Advisory Council of Science and Industry (Commonwealth Institute of Science and Industry from 1920) as secretary and investigator. It is thought she wrote their bulletins (1922–23) on improving crops and classifying barleys, oats, and wheat. In May 1923 Archer was given charge of the Institute's library then following the Council for Scientific and Industrial Research inauguration (1926) was reclassified (1929) librarian and scientific assistant.

With little librarianship training, but with great administrative skills, she turned scattered collections into a smooth running system of 40+ libraries. As Citrus Preservation Committee secretary she compiled an agricultural research register; was effectively head librarian of divisional and experimental stations' libraries. Studying the universal decimal classification whilst visiting British scientific libraries (1936) she encouraged its use by C.S.I.R. libraries (later CSIRO). She created a union catalogue - a great unifying force for CSIRO Libraries, basis of the National Union Catalogue of Monographs (1960). Archer was named Chief Librarian January 1946.

Contribution to libraries
Archer made a lasting contribution to the Library profession as foundation member of the Australian Institute of Librarians (1937) and first female president (1948–49). Despite never sitting for library examinations, in 1941 Archer was appointed to the board of certification and examination.  A.I.L. was reconstituted the Library Association of Australia, (now ALIA) with Archer an active past president (1950–53). She continued demonstrating concern for special librarians insisting their interests be included in the national examination system; and establishing L.A.A. Special Libraries Section (first president in 1952). Believing it important for special groups to be active participants in the Association she led the way holding many L.A.A. Victorian and National positions.

She was admired as an intelligent and energetic person taking on conflicts she felt necessary. When CSIRO division heads wanted their own libraries she played a major role in selecting candidates, ensuring they had sufficient autonomy enabling development of abilities and initiatives, whilst building a cohesive library system.  Archer's keen interest in information exchange was reflected in her support of Inter-Library Loans and promotion of uniform codes and standard forms. In a rare article she wrote about Inter-Library Loans in the Australian Library Journal and speaking at L.A.A.'s 8th Conference (1955).

As a prominent Australian Special Librarian running a national library system she travelled widely, advocating membership of the Library Association and promoting education of librarians. While establishing CSIRO's Perth library (1954) she visited other special libraries offering advice.

Archer said she became a librarian by accident – but was a successful librarian and senior administrator in an organization with few women in senior positions. For her, libraries were about people as much as about books stating "We cannot have pride and satisfaction in our work unless we are adequately trained to cope with it. … giving ourselves to work with interest and enthusiasm, ….. making libraries and librarianship a real force in the community."  (Presidential Address 1949)

Death
Retiring 17 December 1954 she continued botanical studies, painting, walking, and supporting Save the Children Fund by collecting and selling books. Ellinor died at Toorak, Melbourne on 3 May 1979.

Memorials
The Ellinor Archer Pioneer Award is one of the Australian Library and Information Association's highest awards, and is presented to a person or institution pioneering new areas of library and information science (one-off product, new service or program or development of an existing service), incorporating a future-oriented approach.

On November 12th, 2022, Archer was memorialised with a Google Doodle to celebrate her lifetime achievements.

References

Bibliography

'Ellinor Archer by some former members of her staff' Australian Library Journal  v. 22: 10 Nov. 1973 pp 415–17
'Obituary' Australian Library Journal v. 28:15 7 September 1979 pp. 288–289
Special Libraries section Australian Library Journal  v. 1 Jan 1952 pp 64–67 
Streamlining interlibrary reference work: a plea for standardization Australian Library Journal  issue 2 July 1953 pp 78–81

External links
Ellinor Archer Pioneer Award, Australian Library and Information Association

1893 births
1979 deaths
Members of the Order of the British Empire
Australian librarians
Australian women librarians
Scientists from Melbourne
University of Melbourne alumni
University of Melbourne women
People educated at Melbourne Girls Grammar
19th-century Australian women
20th-century Australian women
Australian expatriates in Malaysia